Nénuphar (The Water Lily) is a ballet fantastique in one act, with choreography by Marius Petipa and music by Nikolaï Krotkov (1849-19..). First presented by the Imperial Ballet on November 11/23 (Julian/Gregorian calendar dates), 1890 at the Imperial Mariinsky Theatre in St. Petersburg, Russia. Principal dancers:  Carlotta Brianza

See also 
 List of ballets by title

References

Ballets by Marius Petipa
1890 ballet premieres
Ballets by Nikolai Krotkov
Ballets premiered at the Mariinsky Theatre